Sir Thomas Middleton (1654-1702), of Stansted Mountfitchet, Essex, was an English Member of Parliament.

He was a Member (MP) of the Parliament of England for Harwich in October 1679, 1681, 1689, 1690, 1695 and 1699.

References

1654 births
1702 deaths
17th-century English people
People of the Stuart period
People from Essex
Members of the Parliament of England (pre-1707)